Gomeshabad (also Romanized as Gomeshābād; also known as Gomīshābād) is a village in Zanjanrud-e Pain Rural District, Zanjanrud District, Zanjan County, Zanjan Province, Iran. At the 2006 census, its population was 851, in 189 families.

References 

Populated places in Zanjan County